Symphyotrichum martii (formerly Aster martii) is a species of flowering plant in the family Asteraceae endemic to Minas Gerais, Brazil. It is a perennial, herbaceous, hairless plant whose flowers have about 30 white ray florets.

Citations

References

martii
Endemic flora of Brazil
Flora of Minas Gerais
Plants described in 1882
Taxa named by John Gilbert Baker